Events in the year 1976 in Mexico.

Incumbents

Federal government
 President: Luis Echeverría (until 30 November), José López Portillo (starting 1 December)
 Interior Secretary (SEGOB): Mario Moya Palencia/Jesús Reyes Heroles
 Secretary of Foreign Affairs (SRE): Alfonso García Robles/Santiago Roel García 
 Communications Secretary (SCT): Emilio Mújica Montoya
 Education Secretary (SEP): Víctor Bravo Ahuja/Porfirio Muñoz Ledo
 Secretary of Defense (SEDENA): Hermenegildo Cuenca Díaz/Félix Galván López
 Secretary of Navy: Ricardo Cházaro Lara
 Secretary of Labor and Social Welfare: Pedro Ojeda Paullada
 Secretary of Welfare: Luis Enrique Bracamontes/Pedro Ramírez Vázquez
 Tourism Secretary (SECTUR): Julio Hirschfeld Almada/Guillermo Rossell de la Lama

Supreme Court

 President of the Supreme Court: Mario G. Rebolledo Fernández

Governors

 Aguascalientes: José Refugio Esparza Reyes
 Baja California: Milton Castellanos Everardo
 Baja California Sur: Ángel César Mendoza Arámburo
 Campeche: Rafael Rodríguez Barrera
 Chiapas
Manuel Velasco Suárez (until November 30)
Jorge de la Vega Domínguez (starting December 1)
 Chihuahua: Manuel Bernardo Aguirre
 Coahuila: Oscar Flores Tapia
 Colima: Arturo Noriega Pizano
 Durango: Héctor Mayagoitia Domínguez
 Guanajuato: Luis H. Ducoing Gamba
 Guerrero: Rubén Figueroa Figueroa
 Hidalgo: 
 Jalisco: Alberto Orozco Romero
 State of Mexico: Jorge Jiménez Cantú
 Michoacán: Carlos Torres Manzo
 Morelos
Felipe Rivera Crespo (PRI), until May 18
Armando León Bejarano (PRI), starting May 18
 Nayarit: 
 Nuevo León: Pedro Zorrilla Martínez
 Oaxaca: Miguel Zárate Aquino
 Puebla: Toxqui Fernández de Lara
 Querétaro: Antonio Calzada Urquiza
 Quintana Roo: Jesús Martínez Ross
 San Luis Potosí: Guillermo Fonseca Álvarez
 Sinaloa: Alfonso G. Calderón
 Sonora: Alejandro Carrillo Marcor
 Tabasco: Mario Trujillo García
 Tamaulipas: Enrique Cárdenas González
 Tlaxcala: Emilio Sánchez Piedras
 Veracruz: Rafael Hernández Ochoa
 Yucatán
Carlos Loret de Mola Mediz (until January 31)
Francisco Luna Kan (starting February 1)
 Zacatecas: Fernando Pámanes Escobedo
Regent of Mexico City
Octavio Senties Gomez
Carlos Hank González

Events

 Instituto Tecnológico de Estudios Superiores de Monterrey (Campus Estado de México) founded. 
 Organizacion Editorial Mexicana founded. 
 Universidad Intercontinental established.
 March 15: Autonomous University of Baja California Sur established. 
 July 4: 1976 Mexican general election
 September 7 – 11: Hurricane Kathleen
 September 29 – October 8: Hurricane Madeline
 October 1: Instituto Tecnológico de Nuevo León established. 
 November 6: first issue of Proceso (magazine)  published.
 December 15: The Trolleybuses in Guadalajara start operating.

Awards
Belisario Domínguez Medal of Honor – Jesús Romero Flores

Births
June 7: Nora Salinas, actress
June 10: Mariana Seoane, model, singer, and actress
July 8: Grettell Valdez, television and film actress and former fashion model
December 3: Arleth Terán, soap opera actress

Film

 List of Mexican films of 1976

Sport
 
 1975–76 Mexican Primera División season 
 Diablos Rojos del México win the Mexican League
 Mexico at the 1976 Summer Olympics
 Mexico at the 1976 Summer Paralympics 
 1976 Central American and Caribbean Junior Championships in Athletics in Xalapa.

References

External links

 
Mexico